The Orden wider den tierischen Ernst (Order for Combating Deadly Seriousness) is a carnival order that is awarded once a year by the Aachen Carnival Association to public figures. The order of knights honors people who combine "humor and humanity in office". The popular order has been awarded since 1950. The award ceremony traditionally takes place during a foolish ceremony. The WDR has been recording the ceremony for the first and third programs since 1995. In 2020 around 2.8 million people across Germany watched.

Notable recipients

 1955 August Dresbach
 1957 Max Becker
 1958 Carlo Schmid
 1959 Konrad Adenauer
 1960 Rudolf Eberhard
 1961 Bruno Kreisky
 1962 Rochus Spiecker
 1964 Ewald Bucher
 1965 Paul Mikat
 1967 Karl-Günther von Hase
 1968 Per Hækkerup
 1969 Hermann Höcherl
 1970 Denis Healey
 1972 Helmut Schmidt
 1974 Walter Scheel
 1976 Constantin Heereman von Zuydtwyck
 1978 Ephraim Kishon
 1979 Hans-Dietrich Genscher
 1980 Richard Stücklen
 1982 Manfred Rommel
 1983 Bernhard Vogel
 1984 Friedrich Nowottny
 1985 Norbert Blüm
 1986 Johannes Rau
 1987 August Everding
 1988 Gertrud Höhler
 1989 Franz Josef Strauß (posthum)
 1990 Lothar Späth
 1992 Jack Lang
 1993 Ruud Lubbers
 1994 Renate Schmidt
 1995 Heiner Geißler
 1997 Theodor Waigel
 1998 Heide Simonis
 1999 John C. Kornblum
 2000 Edmund Stoiber
 2001 Guido Westerwelle
 2002 Thomas Borer
 2003 Wendelin Wiedeking
 2004 Henning Scherf
 2005 Karl Lehmann
 2006 Friedrich Merz
 2008 Gloria, Princess of Thurn and Taxis
 2009 Mario Adorf
 2010 Jürgen Rüttgers
 2011 Karl-Theodor zu Guttenberg
 2012 Ottfried Fischer
 2013 Cem Özdemir
 2014 Christian Lindner
 2015 Annegret Kramp-Karrenbauer
 2016 Markus Söder
 2017 Gregor Gysi
 2018 Winfried Kretschmann
 2019 Julia Klöckner
 2020 Armin Laschet
 2022 Iris Berben
 2023 Annalena Baerbock

See also
carnival society

References

External links
 City of Aachen

German awards
Comedy and humor awards
Awards established in 1950